Minye Kyawhtin (also transliterated as Minyekyawdin 1651–1698) was king of Toungoo dynasty of Burma (Myanmar) from 1673 to 1698. Minye Kyawhtin, governor of Pindale, was elected by the ministers of the court over several elder princes as king after his step-brother King Narawara's sudden death in 1673. The group of nobles that had supported the king gained power and purged other groups of the nobles and royalties. The power of the kingdom gradually declined during his quarter-century rule. Burma was attacked by Siam during his reign.

It was in his reign that Zatadawbon Yazawin, formerly a simple constantly updated list of regnal dates of all Burmese dynasties, was made into a full chronicle.

Early life
The future king was born to Ne Myo Ye Kyaw, a minor prince, and his half-sister Khin Ma Min Sit c. April 1651. Both of his parents were children of King Thalun by different minor queens, and the two siblings were married in Waso 1010 ME (10 June 1649 to 9 July 1649). Minye Kyawhtin was given Yamethin, a key city in central Burma, in fief by his grandfather king. He was given the title "Minye Kyawhtin" on 1 May 1672 (5th waxing of Kason 1034 ME) by his step-brother King Narawara at his coronation ceremony.

Minye Kyawhtin was elected to be king about 11 months later when King Narawara suddenly died without leaving an heir. The court, led by minister Sithu Nawrahta, decided on Minye Kyawhtin over several elder and more senior princes, some of whom were sons of King Pye, thinking that they could control him. The court and the young king killed off two elder princes who refused to take the oath of loyalty, and fought off assassination attempts by King Pye's sons, who were Minye Kyawhtin's uncles.

Notes

References

Bibliography
 
 
 
 
 

Rulers of Toungoo
1698 deaths
1651 births
17th-century Burmese monarchs